Noffke is a German surname. Notable people with the surname include:

 Ashley Noffke (born 1977), Australian cricketer
 Chris Noffke (born 1988), Australian long jumper
 Gary Lee Noffke (born 1943), American artist and metalsmith
 W.E. Noffke (1878–1964), Canadian architect

German-language surnames